Manisanda Khin U was queen to three consecutive kings of Pagan dynasty of Burma (Myanmar). The ethnic Mon queen is famous in Burmese history for her love triangle with Gen. Kyansittha and King Anawrahta. Their story has been compared to the legend of King Arthur, Lancelot and Guinevere.

Manisanda was a daughter of the ruler of Pegu (Bago), which was subject to Pagan. Circa early 1070s, her father gave the princess to Anawrahta as gratitude for Pagan's help in repelling attacks on Pegu by foreign invaders from the direction of Chiang Mai. Kyansittha, who led the Pagan army that drove out the invaders, rode alongside the lady Manisanda who was borne in a curtained litter. During the long journey, they fell in love with each other so violently that the matter had to be reported to Anawrahta. The king nearly killed Kyansittha, and banished his adopted son and best general for the rest of his reign. The princess, who was probably still in her early to mid teens, became one of his queens.

After Anawrahta's death, Saw Lu became king and married her. She became the chief queen soon after as Lu's chief queen Usaukpan died soon after his accession. Uninterested in running the kingdom, Lu brought back Kyansittha from banishment. But Kyansittha and Manisanda resumed their love affair, and Lu too had to banish Kyansittha. Her father, the ruler of Pegu, had died by then, and Lu appointed his childhood friend Yamankan as governor of Pegu. In 1084, Lu was killed by Yamankan who had raised a rebellion against Pagan rule.

Kyansittha defeated the rebellion, and became king of Pagan. He married his love Manisanda for whom he had twice endured exile, and made her his queen. She became queen to the third monarch in succession.

References

Bibliography
 
 
 

Chief queens consort of Pagan
Queens consort of Pagan
Burmese people of Mon descent
11th-century Burmese women
12th-century Burmese women